The Chernobyl disaster was a nuclear accident that occurred on 26 April 1986 at the No. 4 reactor in the Chernobyl Nuclear Power Plant, near the city of Pripyat in the north of the Ukrainian SSR in the Soviet Union. It is one of only two nuclear energy accidents rated at seven—the maximum severity—on the International Nuclear Event Scale, the other being the 2011 Fukushima nuclear disaster in Japan. The initial emergency response, together with later decontamination of the environment, involved more than 500,000 personnel and cost an estimated 18 billion roubles—roughly US$68 billion in 2019, adjusted for inflation.

The accident occurred during a safety test meant to measure the ability of the steam turbine to power the emergency feedwater pumps of an RBMK-type nuclear reactor in the event of a simultaneous loss of external power and major coolant leak. During a planned decrease of reactor power in preparation for the test, the operators accidentally dropped power output to near-zero, due partially to xenon poisoning. While recovering from the power drop and stabilizing the reactor, the operators removed a number of control rods which exceeded limits set by the operating procedures. Upon test completion, the operators triggered a reactor shutdown. Due to a design flaw, this action resulted in localized increases in reactivity within the reactor (i.e., "positive scram"). That brought about the rupture of fuel channels and a rapid drop in pressure, thereby prompting the coolant to flash to steam. Neutron absorption thus dropped, leading to an increase in reactor activity, which further increased coolant temperatures (a positive feedback loop). This process led to steam explosions and the melting of the reactor core.

The meltdown and explosions ruptured the reactor core and destroyed the reactor building. This was immediately followed by an open-air reactor core fire which lasted until 4 May 1986, during which airborne radioactive contaminants were released and deposited onto other parts of the USSR and Europe. The fire released about the same amount of radioactive material as the initial explosion. In response to the initial accident, a  radius exclusion zone was created 36 hours after the accident, from which approximately 49,000 people were evacuated, primarily from Pripyat.

Following the reactor explosion, which killed two engineers and severely burned two more, a massive emergency operation to put out the fire, stabilize the reactor, and clean up the ejected radioactive material began. During the immediate emergency response, 237 workers were hospitalized, of which 134 exhibited symptoms of acute radiation syndrome (ARS). Among those hospitalized, 28 died within the following three months, all of whom were hospitalized for ARS. In the following 10 years, 14 more workers (9 who had been hospitalized with ARS) died of various causes mostly unrelated to radiation exposure.

Chernobyl's health effects to the general population are uncertain. An excess of 15 childhood thyroid cancer deaths were documented . A United Nations committee found that to date fewer than 100 deaths have resulted from the fallout. Determining the total eventual number of exposure related deaths is uncertain based on the linear no-threshold model, a contested statistical model. Model predictions of the eventual total death toll in the coming decades vary. The most widely cited studies by the World Health Organization predict an eventual 9,000 cancer related fatalities in Ukraine, Belarus and Russia.

Following the disaster, Pripyat was replaced by the new purpose-built city of Slavutych. The USSR built the protective Chernobyl Nuclear Power Plant sarcophagus by December 1986. It reduced the spread of radioactive contamination from the wreckage and protected it from weathering. The confinement shelter also provided radiological protection for the crews of the undamaged reactors at the site, which were restarted in late 1986 and 1987. However, this containment structure was only intended to last for 30 years, and required considerable reinforcement in the early 2000s. The Shelter was supplemented in 2017 by the Chernobyl New Safe Confinement which was constructed around the old structure. This larger enclosure aims to enable the removal of both the sarcophagus and the reactor debris while containing the radioactive materials inside. Clean-up is scheduled for completion by 2065.

Background

Reactor cooling after shutdown 

In power-generating operation, most of the heat generated in a nuclear reactor by its fuel rods is derived from nuclear fission, but a significant fraction (over 6%) is derived from the radioactive decay of the accumulated fission products; a process known as decay heat. This decay heat continues for some time after the fission chain reaction has been stopped, such as following a reactor shutdown, either emergency or planned, and continued pumped circulation of coolant is essential to prevent core overheating, or in the worst case, core meltdown. RBMK reactors, like those at Chernobyl, use water as a coolant, circulated by electrically-driven pumps.

In case of a total power loss at the station, each of Chernobyl's reactors had three backup diesel generators, but they took 60–75 seconds to attain full load and generate the 5.5megawatt output required to run one main pump. In the interim, special counterweights on each pump would enable them to provide coolant via inertia, thereby bridging the gap to generator startup. However, a potential safety risk existed in the event that a station blackout occurred simultaneously with the rupture of a  coolant pipe (the so-called Design Basis Accident). In this scenario the emergency core cooling system (ECCS) needed to pump additional water into the core, replacing coolant lost to evaporation. It had been theorized that the rotational momentum of the reactor's steam turbine could be used to generate the required electrical power to operate the ECCS via the feedwater pumps. The turbine's speed would run down as energy was taken from it, but analysis indicated that there might be sufficient energy to provide electrical power to run the coolant pumps for 45 seconds. This would not quite bridge the gap between an external power failure and the full availability of the emergency generators, but would alleviate the situation.

Safety test 
The turbine run-down energy capability still needed to be confirmed experimentally, and previous tests had ended unsuccessfully. An initial test carried out in 1982 indicated that the excitation voltage of the turbine-generator was insufficient; it did not maintain the desired magnetic field after the turbine trip. The electrical system was modified, and the test was repeated in 1984 but again proved unsuccessful. In 1985, the test was conducted a third time but also yielded no results due to a problem with the recording equipment. The test procedure was to be run again in 1986 and was scheduled to take place during a controlled power-down of reactor No. 4, which was preparatory to a planned maintenance outage.

A test procedure had been written, but the authors were not aware of the unusual RBMK-1000 reactor behaviour under the planned operating conditions. It was regarded as purely an electrical test of the generator, not a complex unit test, even though it involved critical unit systems. According to the regulations in place at the time, such a test did not require approval by either the chief design authority for the reactor (NIKIET) or the Soviet nuclear safety regulator. The test program called for disabling the emergency core cooling system, a passive/active system of core cooling intended to provide water to the core in a loss-of-coolant accident, and approval from the Chernobyl site chief engineer had been obtained according to regulations.

The test procedure was intended to run as follows:

Test Preparation
 The test would take place prior to a scheduled reactor shutdown
 The reactor thermal power was to be reduced to between 700 MW and 1000 MW (to allow for adequate cooling, as the turbine would be spun at operating speed whilst disconnected from the power grid)
 The steam-turbine generator was to be run at normal operating speed
 Four out of eight main circulating pumps were to be supplied with off-site power, while the other four would be powered by the turbine
Electrical Test
 When the correct conditions were achieved, the steam supply to the turbine generator would be closed off, and the reactor would be shut down
 The voltage provided by the coasting turbine would be measured, along with the voltage and RPMs of the four main circulating pumps being powered by the turbine
 When the emergency generators supplied full electrical power, the turbine generator would be allowed to continue free-wheeling down

Test delay and shift change 

The test was to be conducted during the day-shift of 25 April 1986 as part of a scheduled reactor shut down. The day shift crew had been instructed in advance on the reactor operating conditions to run the test and in addition, a special team of electrical engineers was present to conduct the one-minute test of the new voltage regulating system once the correct conditions had been reached. As planned, a gradual reduction in the output of the power unit began at 01:06 on 25 April, and the power level had reached 50% of its nominal 3,200 MW thermal level by the beginning of the day shift.

The day shift performed many unrelated maintenance tasks, and was scheduled to perform the test at 14:15. Preparations for the test were carried out, including the disabling of the emergency core cooling system. Meanwhile, another regional power station unexpectedly went offline. At 14:00, the Kiev electrical grid controller requested that the further reduction of Chernobyl's output be postponed, as power was needed to satisfy the peak evening demand, so the test was postponed.

Soon, the day shift was replaced by the evening shift. Despite the delay, the emergency core cooling system was left disabled. This system had to be disconnected via a manual isolating slide valve which in practice meant that two or three people spent the whole shift manually turning sailboat-helm sized valve wheels. The system would have no influence on the events that unfolded next, but allowing the reactor to run for 11 hours outside of the test without emergency protection was indicative of a general lack of safety culture.

At 23:04, the Kiev grid controller allowed the reactor shutdown to resume. This delay had some serious consequences: the day shift had long since departed, the evening shift was also preparing to leave, and the night shift would not take over until midnight, well into the job. According to plan, the test should have been finished during the day shift, and the night shift would only have had to maintain decay heat cooling systems in an otherwise shut-down plant.

The night shift had very limited time to prepare for and carry out the experiment. Anatoly Dyatlov, deputy chief-engineer of the Chernobyl Nuclear Power Plant, was present to supervise and direct the test. He was one of the test's chief authors and he was the highest-ranking individual present. Unit Shift Supervisor Aleksandr Akimov was in charge of the Unit 4 night shift, and Leonid Toptunov was the Senior Reactor Control Engineer responsible for the reactor's operational regimen, including the movement of the control rods. 25 year old Toptunov had worked independently as a senior engineer for approximately three months.

Unexpected drop of the reactor power 

The test plan called for a gradual decrease in reactor power to a thermal level of 700–1000 MW, and an output of 720 MW was reached at 00:05 on 26 April. However, due to the reactor's production of a fission byproduct, xenon-135, which is a reaction-inhibiting neutron absorber, power continued to decrease in the absence of further operator action, a process known as reactor poisoning. In steady-state operation, this is avoided because xenon-135 is "burned off" as quickly as it is created from decaying iodine-135 by the absorption of neutrons from the ongoing chain reaction, becoming highly stable xenon-136. With the reactor power reduced, high quantities of previously produced iodine-135 were decaying into the neutron-absorbing xenon-135 faster than the reduced neutron flux could "burn it off". Xenon poisoning in this context made reactor control more difficult, but was a predictable and well-understood phenomenon during such a power reduction.

When the reactor power had decreased to approximately 500 MW, the reactor power control was switched from LAR (Local Automatic Regulator) to the Automatic Regulators, in order to manually maintain the required power level. AR-1 then activated, removing all four of AR-1's Control Rods automatically, but AR-2 failed to activate due to an imbalance in its ionization chambers. In response, Toptunov reduced power to stabilize the Automatic Regulators' ionization sensors. The result was a sudden power drop to an unintended near-shutdown state, with a power output of 30 MW thermal or less. The exact circumstances that caused the power drop are unknown. Most reports attribute the power drop to Toptunov's error, but Dyatlov reported that it was due to a fault in the AR-2 system.

The reactor was now producing only 5% of the minimum initial power level prescribed for the test. This low reactivity inhibited the burn-off of xenon-135 within the reactor core and hindered the rise of reactor power. To increase power, control-room personnel removed numerous control rods from the reactor. Several minutes elapsed before the reactor was restored to 160 MW at 0:39, at which point most control rods were at their upper limits, but the rod configuration was still within its normal operating limit, with Operational Reactivity Margin (ORM) equivalent to having more than 15 rods inserted. Over the next twenty minutes, reactor power would be increased further to 200 MW.

The operation of the reactor at the low power level (and high poisoning level) was accompanied by unstable core temperatures and coolant flow, and, possibly, by instability of neutron flux. The control room received repeated emergency signals regarding the low levels in one half of the steam/water separator drums, with accompanying drum separator pressure warnings. In response, personnel triggered several rapid influxes of feedwater. Relief valves opened to relieve excess steam into a turbine condenser.

Reactor conditions priming the accident 
When a power level of 200 MW was reattained, preparation for the experiment continued, although the power level was much lower than the prescribed 700 MW. As part of the test program, two additional main circulating (coolant) pumps were activated at 01:05. The increased coolant flow lowered the overall core temperature and reduced the existing steam voids in the core. Because water absorbs neutrons better than steam, the neutron flux and reactivity decreased. The operators responded by removing more manual control rods to maintain power. It was around this time that the number of control rods inserted in the reactor fell below the required value of 15. This was not apparent to the operators because the RBMK did not have any instruments capable of calculating the inserted rod worth in real time.

The combined effect of these various actions was an extremely unstable reactor configuration. Nearly all of the 211 control rods had been extracted manually, and excessively high coolant flow rates through the core meant that the coolant was entering the reactor very close to the boiling point. Unlike other light-water reactor designs, the RBMK design at that time had a positive void coefficient of reactivity at low power levels. This meant that the formation of steam bubbles (voids) from boiling cooling water intensified the nuclear chain reaction owing to voids having lower neutron absorption than water. Unbeknownst to the operators, the void coefficient was not counterbalanced by other reactivity effects in the given operating regime, meaning that any increase in boiling would produce more steam voids which further intensified the chain reaction, leading to a positive feedback loop. Given this characteristic, reactor No. 4 was now at risk of a runaway increase in its core power with nothing to restrain it. The reactor was now very sensitive to the regenerative effect of steam voids on reactor power.

Accident

Test execution 

At 01:23:04, the test began. Four of the eight main circulating pumps (MCP) were to be powered by voltage from the coasting turbine, while the remaining four pumps received electrical power from the grid as normal. The steam to the turbines was shut off, beginning a run-down of the turbine generator. The diesel generators started and sequentially picked up loads; the generators were to have completely picked up the MCPs' power needs by 01:23:43. As the momentum of the turbine generator decreased, so did the power it produced for the pumps. The water flow rate decreased, leading to increased formation of steam voids in the coolant flowing up through the fuel pressure tubes.

Reactor shutdown and power excursion 

At 01:23:40, as recorded by the SKALA centralized control system, a scram (emergency shutdown) of the reactor was initiated as the experiment was wrapping up. The scram was started when the AZ-5 button (also known as the EPS-5 button) of the reactor emergency protection system was pressed: this engaged the drive mechanism on all control rods to fully insert them, including the manual control rods that had been withdrawn earlier.

The personnel had already intended to shut down using the AZ-5 button in preparation for scheduled maintenance and the scram likely preceded the sharp increase in power. However, the precise reason why the button was pressed when it was is not certain, as only the deceased Akimov and Toptunov partook in that decision, though the atmosphere in the control room was calm at that moment. Meanwhile, the RBMK designers claim that the button had to have been pressed only after the reactor already began to self-destruct.

When the AZ-5 button was pressed, the insertion of control rods into the reactor core began. A bigger problem was the design of the RBMK control rods, each of which had a graphite neutron moderator section attached to its end to boost reactor output by displacing water when the control rod section had been fully withdrawn from the reactor. That is, when a control rod was at maximum extraction, a neutron-moderating graphite extension was centered in the core with  columns of water above and below it.

Consequently, injecting a control rod downward into the reactor in a scram initially displaced neutron-absorbing water in the lower portion of the reactor with neutron-moderating graphite. Thus, an emergency scram could initially increase the reaction rate in the lower part of the core. This behaviour was discovered when the initial insertion of control rods in another RBMK reactor at Ignalina Nuclear Power Plant in 1983 induced a power spike. Procedural countermeasures were not implemented in response to Ignalina. The IAEA investigative report INSAG-7 later stated, "Apparently, there was a widespread view that the conditions under which the positive scram effect would be important would never occur. However, they did appear in almost every detail in the course of the actions leading to the Chernobyl accident."

A few seconds into the scram, a power spike did occur, and the core overheated, causing some of the fuel rods to fracture. Some have speculated that this also blocked the control rod columns, jamming them at one-third insertion. Within three seconds the reactor output rose above 530 MW.

Instruments did not register the subsequent course of events; they were reconstructed through mathematical simulation. Per the simulation, the power spike would have caused an increase in fuel temperature and steam buildup, leading to a rapid increase in steam pressure. This caused the fuel cladding to fail, releasing the fuel elements into the coolant and rupturing the channels in which these elements were located.

Steam explosions 

As the scram continued, the reactor output jumped to around 30,000 MW thermal, 10 times its normal operational output, the indicated last reading on the power meter on the control panel. Some estimate the power spike may have gone 10 times higher than that. It was not possible to reconstruct the precise sequence of the processes that led to the destruction of the reactor and the power unit building, but a steam explosion, like the explosion of a steam boiler from excess vapour pressure, appears to have been the next event. There is a general understanding that it was explosive steam pressure from the damaged fuel channels escaping into the reactor's exterior cooling structure that caused the explosion that destroyed the reactor casing, tearing off and blasting the upper plate called the upper biological shield, to which the entire reactor assembly is fastened, through the roof of the reactor building. This is believed to be the first explosion that many heard.

This explosion ruptured further fuel channels, as well as severing most of the coolant lines feeding the reactor chamber, and as a result, the remaining coolant flashed to steam and escaped the reactor core. The total water loss combined with a high positive void coefficient further increased the reactor's thermal power.

A second, more powerful explosion occurred about two or three seconds after the first; this explosion dispersed the damaged core and effectively terminated the nuclear chain reaction. This explosion also compromised more of the reactor containment vessel and ejected hot lumps of graphite moderator. The ejected graphite and the demolished channels still in the remains of the reactor vessel caught fire on exposure to air, significantly contributing to the spread of radioactive fallout and the contamination of outlying areas.

According to observers outside Unit 4, burning lumps of material and sparks shot into the air above the reactor. Some of them fell onto the roof of the machine hall and started a fire. About 25% of the red-hot graphite blocks and overheated material from the fuel channels was ejected. Parts of the graphite blocks and fuel channels were out of the reactor building. As a result of the damage to the building, an airflow through the core was established by the core's high temperature. The air ignited the hot graphite and started a graphite fire.

After the larger explosion, several employees at the power station went outside to get a clearer view of the extent of the damage. One such survivor, Alexander Yuvchenko, recounts that once he stepped out and looked up towards the reactor hall, he saw a "very beautiful" laser-like beam of blue light caused by the ionized-air glow that appeared to be "flooding up into infinity".

There were initially several hypotheses about the nature of the second explosion. One view was that the second explosion was caused by the combustion of hydrogen, which had been produced either by the overheated steam-zirconium reaction or by the reaction of red-hot graphite with steam that produced hydrogen and carbon monoxide. Another hypothesis, by Konstantin Checherov, published in 1998, was that the second explosion was a thermal explosion of the reactor due to the uncontrollable escape of fast neutrons caused by the complete water loss in the reactor core. A third hypothesis was that the second explosion was another steam explosion. According to this version, the first explosion was a more minor steam explosion in the circulating loop, causing a loss of coolant flow and pressure that in turn caused the water still in the core to flash to steam; this second explosion then caused the majority of the damage to the reactor and containment building. These ideas are discussed in further detail further down.

Crisis management

Fire containment 

Contrary to safety regulations, bitumen, a combustible material, had been used in the construction of the roof of the reactor building and the turbine hall. Ejected material ignited at least five fires on the roof of the adjacent reactor No. 3, which was still operating. It was imperative to put those fires out and protect the cooling systems of reactor No. 3. Inside reactor No. 3, the chief of the night shift, Yuri Bagdasarov, wanted to shut down the reactor immediately, but chief engineer Nikolai Fomin would not allow this. The operators were given respirators and potassium iodide tablets and told to continue working. At 05:00, Bagdasarov made his own decision to shut down the reactor, which was confirmed in writing by Dyatlov and Station Shift Supervisor Rogozhkin.

Shortly after the accident, firefighters arrived to try to extinguish the fires. First on the scene was a Chernobyl Power Station firefighter brigade under the command of Lieutenant Volodymyr Pravyk, who died on 11 May 1986 of acute radiation sickness. They were not told how dangerously radioactive the smoke and the debris were, and may not even have known that the accident was anything more than a regular electrical fire: "We didn't know it was the reactor. No one had told us." Grigorii Khmel, the driver of one of the fire engines, later described what happened:

Anatoli Zakharov, a fireman stationed in Chernobyl since 1980, offered a different description in 2008: "I remember joking to the others, 'There must be an incredible amount of radiation here. We'll be lucky if we're all still alive in the morning.'" He also stated, "Of course we knew! If we'd followed regulations, we would never have gone near the reactor. But it was a moral obligation—our duty. We were like kamikaze."

The immediate priority was to extinguish fires on the roof of the station and the area around the building containing Reactor No. 4 to protect No. 3 and keep its core cooling systems intact. The fires were extinguished by 5:00, but many firefighters received high doses of radiation. The fire inside reactor No. 4 continued to burn until 10 May 1986; it is possible that well over half of the graphite burned out.

It is now known that virtually none of these materials reached the core. Historians estimate that about 600 Soviet pilots risked dangerous levels of radiation to fly the thousands of flights needed to cover reactor No. 4 in this attempt to seal off radiation.

From eyewitness accounts of the firefighters involved before they died (as reported on the CBC television series Witness), one described his experience of the radiation as "tasting like metal", and feeling a sensation similar to that of pins and needles all over his face. This is consistent with the description given by Louis Slotin, a Manhattan Project physicist who died days after a fatal radiation overdose from a criticality accident.

The explosion and fire threw hot particles of the nuclear fuel and also far more dangerous fission products (radioactive isotopes such as caesium-137, iodine-131, strontium-90, and other radionuclides) into the air. The residents of the surrounding area observed the radioactive cloud on the night of the explosion.

Radiation levels 
The ionizing radiation levels in the worst-hit areas of the reactor building have been estimated to be 5.6 roentgens per second (R/s), equivalent to more than 20,000 roentgens per hour. A lethal dose is around 500 roentgens (~5 Gray (Gy) in modern radiation units) over five hours, so in some areas, unprotected workers received fatal doses in less than a minute. However, a dosimeter capable of measuring up to 1,000 R/s was buried in the rubble of a collapsed part of the building, and another one failed when turned on. Most remaining dosimeters had limits of 0.001 R/s and therefore read "off scale". Thus, the reactor crew could ascertain only that the radiation levels were somewhere above 0.001 R/s (3.6 R/h), while the true levels were much higher in some areas.

Because of the inaccurate low readings, the reactor crew chief Aleksandr Akimov assumed that the reactor was intact. The evidence of pieces of graphite and reactor fuel lying around the building was ignored, and the readings of another dosimeter brought in by 04:30 were dismissed under the assumption that the new dosimeter must have been defective. Akimov stayed with his crew in the reactor building until morning, sending members of his crew to try to pump water into the reactor. None of them wore any protective gear. Most, including Akimov, died from radiation exposure within three weeks.

Evacuation 

The nearby city of Pripyat was not immediately evacuated. The townspeople, in the early hours of the morning, at 01:23 local time, went about their usual business, completely oblivious to what had just happened. However, within a few hours of the explosion, dozens of people fell ill. Later, they reported severe headaches and metallic tastes in their mouths, along with uncontrollable fits of coughing and vomiting. As the plant was run by authorities in Moscow, the government of Ukraine did not receive prompt information on the accident.

Valentyna Shevchenko, then Chairwoman of the Presidium of Verkhovna Rada of the Ukrainian SSR, recalls that Ukraine's acting Minister of Internal Affairs Vasyl Durdynets phoned her at work at 09:00 to report current affairs; only at the end of the conversation did he add that there had been a fire at the Chernobyl nuclear power plant, but it was extinguished and everything was fine. When Shevchenko asked "How are the people?", he replied that there was nothing to be concerned about: "Some are celebrating a wedding, others are gardening, and others are fishing in the Pripyat River".

Shevchenko then spoke over the phone to Volodymyr Shcherbytsky, general secretary of the Communist Party of Ukraine and de facto head of state, who said he anticipated a delegation of the state commission headed by Boris Shcherbina, the deputy chairman of the Council of Ministers of the USSR.

A commission was established later in the day to investigate the accident. It was headed by Valery Legasov, First Deputy Director of the Kurchatov Institute of Atomic Energy, and included leading nuclear specialist Evgeny Velikhov, hydro-meteorologist Yuri Izrael, radiologist Leonid Ilyin, and others. They flew to Boryspil International Airport and arrived at the power plant in the evening of 26 April. By that time two people had already died and 52 were hospitalized. The delegation soon had ample evidence that the reactor was destroyed and extremely high levels of radiation had caused a number of cases of radiation exposure. In the early daylight hours of 27 April, approximately 36 hours after the initial blast, they ordered the evacuation of Pripyat. Initially it was decided to evacuate the population for three days; later this was made permanent.

By 11:00 on 27 April, buses had arrived in Pripyat to start the evacuation. The evacuation began at 14:00. A translated excerpt of the evacuation announcement follows:

To expedite the evacuation, residents were told to bring only what was necessary, and that they would remain evacuated for approximately three days. As a result, most personal belongings were left behind, and remain there today. By 15:00, 53,000 people were evacuated to various villages of the Kiev region. The next day, talks began for evacuating people from the  zone. The Chernobyl Nuclear Power Plant Exclusion Zone has remained ever since, although its shape has changed and its size has been expanded.

The surveying and detection of isolated fallout hotspots outside this zone over the following year eventually resulted in 135,000 long-term evacuees in total agreeing to be moved. The years between 1986 and 2000 saw the near tripling in the total number of permanently resettled persons from the most severely contaminated areas to approximately 350,000.

Official announcement 

Evacuation began one and a half days before the accident was publicly acknowledged by the Soviet Union. Workers at Forsmark reported the case to the Swedish Radiation Safety Authority, which determined that the radiation had originated elsewhere. That day, the Swedish government contacted the Soviet government to inquire about whether there had been a nuclear accident in the Soviet Union. The Soviets initially denied it, and it was only after the Swedish government suggested they were about to file an official alert with the International Atomic Energy Agency, that the Soviet government admitted that an accident had taken place at Chernobyl.

At first, the Soviets only conceded that a minor accident had occurred, but once they began evacuating more than 100,000 people, the full scale of the situation was realized by the global community. At 21:02 the evening of 28 April, a 20-second announcement was read in the TV news programme Vremya: "There has been an accident at the Chernobyl Nuclear Power Plant. One of the nuclear reactors was damaged. The effects of the accident are being remedied. Assistance has been provided for any affected people. An investigative commission has been set up."

This was the entire announcement, and the first time the Soviet Union officially announced a nuclear accident. The Telegraph Agency of the Soviet Union (TASS) then discussed the Three Mile Island accident and other American nuclear accidents, which Serge Schmemann of The New York Times wrote was an example of the common Soviet tactic of whataboutism. The mention of a commission also indicated to observers the seriousness of the incident, and subsequent state radio broadcasts were replaced with classical music, which was a common method of preparing the public for an announcement of a tragedy in the USSR.

Around the same time, ABC News released its report about the disaster. Shevchenko was the first of the Ukrainian state top officials to arrive at the disaster site early on 28 April. There she spoke with members of medical staff and people, who were calm and hopeful that they could soon return to their homes. Shevchenko returned home near midnight, stopping at a radiological checkpoint in Vilcha, one of the first that were set up soon after the accident.

There was a notification from Moscow that there was no reason to postpone the 1 May International Workers' Day celebrations in Kiev (including the annual parade), but on 30 April a meeting of the Political bureau of the Central Committee of the CPSU took place to discuss the plan for the upcoming celebration. Scientists were reporting that the radiological background level in Kiev was normal. At the meeting, which was finished at 18:00, it was decided to shorten celebrations from the regular three and a half to four hours to under two hours.

Several buildings in Pripyat were officially kept open after the disaster to be used by workers still involved with the plant. These included the Jupiter factory (which closed in 1996) and the Azure Swimming Pool, used by the Chernobyl liquidators for recreation during the clean-up (which closed in 1998).

Core meltdown risk mitigation

Bubbler pools
Two floors of bubbler pools beneath the reactor served as a large water reservoir for the emergency cooling pumps and as a pressure suppression system capable of condensing steam in case of a small broken steam pipe; the third floor above them, below the reactor, served as a steam tunnel. The steam released by a broken pipe was supposed to enter the steam tunnel and be led into the pools to bubble through a layer of water. After the disaster, the pools and the basement were flooded because of ruptured cooling water pipes and accumulated firefighting water.

It was feared that if this mixture melted through the floor into the pool of water, the resulting steam production would further contaminate the area or even cause a steam explosion, ejecting more radioactive material from the reactor. It became necessary to drain the pool. These fears ultimately proved unfounded, since corium began dripping harmlessly into the flooded bubbler pools before the water could be removed. The molten fuel hit the water and cooled into a light-brown ceramic pumice, whose low density allowed the substance to float on the water's surface.

Unaware of this fact, the government commission directed that the bubbler pools be drained by opening its sluice gates. The valves controlling it, however, were located in a flooded corridor in a subterranean annex adjacent to the reactor building. Volunteers in diving suits and respirators (for protection against radioactive aerosols), and equipped with dosimeters, entered the knee-deep radioactive water and managed to open the valves. These were the engineers Alexei Ananenko and Valeri Bezpalov (who knew where the valves were), accompanied by the shift supervisor Boris Baranov. All three men were awarded the Order For Courage by Ukrainian President Petro Poroshenko in May 2018.

Numerous media reports falsely suggested that all three men died just days after the incident. In fact all three survived and continued to work in the nuclear energy industry. Alexy Ananenko and Valeri Bezpalov were still alive as of 2021, while Baranov had died of heart failure in 2005 at age 65. 
Once the bubbler pool gates were opened by the three volunteers, fire brigade pumps were then used to drain the basement. The operation was not completed until 8 May, after  of water were pumped out.

Foundation protection measures
The government commission was concerned that the molten core would burn into the earth and contaminate groundwater below the reactor. To reduce the likelihood of this, it was decided to freeze the earth beneath the reactor, which would also stabilize the foundations. Using oil well drilling equipment, the injection of liquid nitrogen began on 4 May. This idea was quickly scrapped.

As an alternative, subway builders and coal miners were deployed to excavate a tunnel below the reactor to make room for a cooling system. The final makeshift design for the cooling system was to incorporate a coiled formation of pipes cooled with water and covered on top with a thin thermally conductive graphite layer. The graphite layer as a natural refractory material would prevent the concrete above from melting. This system was designed by Leonid Bolshov, the director of the Institute for Nuclear Safety and Development formed in 1988. Bolshov's graphite-concrete "sandwich" would be similar in concept to later core catchers that are now part of many nuclear reactor designs.

Bolshov's graphite cooling plate, alongside the prior nitrogen injection proposal, were not used following the drop in aerial temperatures and indicative reports that the fuel melt had stopped. It was later determined that the fuel had flowed three floors, with a few cubic meters coming to rest at ground level. The precautionary underground channel with its active cooling was therefore deemed redundant, as the fuel was self-cooling. The excavation was then simply filled with concrete to strengthen the foundation below the reactor.

Immediate site and area remediation

Debris removal
In the months after the explosion, attention turned to removing the radioactive debris from the roof. While the worst of the radioactive debris had remained inside what was left of the reactor, it was estimated that there was approximately 100 tons of debris on that roof which had to be removed to enable the safe construction of the 'sarcophagus'—a concrete structure that would entomb the reactor and reduce radioactive dust being released into the atmosphere. The initial plan was to use robots to clear the debris off the roof. The Soviets used approximately 60 remote-controlled robots, most of them built in the Soviet Union itself. Many failed due to the difficult terrain, combined with the effect of high radiation fields on their batteries and electronic controls; in 1987, Valery Legasov, first deputy director of the Kurchatov Institute of Atomic Energy in Moscow, said: "We learned that robots are not the great remedy for everything. Where there was very high radiation, the robot ceased to be a robot—the electronics quit working."
Consequently, the most highly radioactive materials were shoveled by Chernobyl liquidators from the military wearing heavy protective gear (dubbed "bio-robots"); these soldiers could only spend a maximum of 40–90 seconds working on the rooftops of the surrounding buildings because of the extremely high doses of radiation given off by the blocks of graphite and other debris. Though the soldiers were only supposed to perform the role of the "bio-robot" a maximum of once, some soldiers reported having done this task five or six times. Only 10% of the debris cleared from the roof was performed by robots; the other 90% was removed by approximately 5,000 men who absorbed, on average, an estimated dose of 25 rem (250 mSv) of radiation each.

Construction of the sarcophagus

With the extinguishing of the open air reactor fire, the next step was to prevent the spread of contamination. This could be due to wind action which could carry away loose contamination, and by birds which could land within the wreckage and then carry contamination elsewhere. In addition, rainwater could wash contamination away from the reactor area and into the sub-surface water table, where it could migrate outside the site area. Rainwater falling on the wreckage could also weaken the remaining reactor structure by accelerating corrosion of steelwork. A further challenge was to reduce the large amount of emitted gamma radiation, which was a hazard to the workforce operating the adjacent reactor No. 3.

The solution chosen was to enclose the wrecked reactor by the construction of a huge composite steel and concrete shelter, which became known as the "Sarcophagus". It had to be erected quickly and within the constraints of high levels of ambient gamma radiation. The design started on 20 May 1986, 24 days after the disaster, and construction was from June to late November. This major construction project was carried out under the very difficult circumstances of high levels of radiation both from the core remnants and the deposited radioactive contamination around it. The construction workers had to be protected from radiation, and techniques such as crane drivers working from lead-lined control cabins were employed. The construction work included erecting walls around the perimeter, clearing and surface concreting the surrounding ground to remove sources of radiation and to allow access for large construction machinery, constructing a thick radiation shielding wall to protect the workers in reactor No. 3, fabricating a high-rise buttress to strengthen weak parts of the old structure, constructing an overall roof, and provisioning a ventilation extract system to capture any airborne contamination arising within the shelter.

Investigations of the reactor condition

During the construction of the sarcophagus, a scientific team, as part of an investigation dubbed "Complex Expedition", re-entered the reactor to locate and contain nuclear fuel to prevent another explosion. These scientists manually collected cold fuel rods, but great heat was still emanating from the core. Rates of radiation in different parts of the building were monitored by drilling holes into the reactor and inserting long metal detector tubes. The scientists were exposed to high levels of radiation and radioactive dust.
The mass was called "the elephant's foot" for its wrinkled appearance. It was composed of melted sand, concrete, and a large amount of nuclear fuel that had escaped from the reactor. The concrete beneath the reactor was steaming hot, and was breached by now-solidified lava and spectacular unknown crystalline forms termed chernobylite. It was concluded that there was no further risk of explosion.

Area cleanup

The official contaminated zones saw a massive clean-up effort lasting seven months. The official reason for such early (and dangerous) decontamination efforts, rather than allowing time for natural decay, was that the land must be repopulated and brought back into cultivation. Indeed, within fifteen months 75% of the land was under cultivation, even though only a third of the evacuated villages were resettled. Defence forces must have done much of the work. Yet this land was of marginal agricultural value. According to historian David Marples, the administration had a psychological purpose for the clean-up: they wished to forestall panic regarding nuclear energy, and even to restart the Chernobyl power station.
Although a number of radioactive emergency vehicles were buried in trenches, many of the vehicles used by the liquidators, including the helicopters, still remained, as of 2018, parked in a field in the Chernobyl area. Scavengers have since removed many functioning, but highly radioactive, parts. Liquidators worked under deplorable conditions, poorly informed and with poor protection. Many, if not most of them, exceeded radiation safety limits.

The urban decontamination liquidators first washed buildings and roads with "Barda", a sticky polymerizing fluid, designed to entrap radioactive dust.

A unique "clean up" medal was given to the clean-up workers, known as "liquidators".

Investigations and the evolution of identified causes 
To investigate the causes of the accident the IAEA used the International Nuclear Safety Advisory Group (INSAG), which had been created by the IAEA in 1985. It produced two significant reports on Chernobyl; INSAG-1 in 1986, and a revised report, INSAG-7 in 1992. In summary, according to INSAG-1, the main cause of the accident was the operators' actions, but according to INSAG-7, the main cause was the reactor's design.
Both IAEA reports identified an inadequate "safety culture" (INSAG-1 coined the term) at all managerial and operational levels as a major underlying factor of different aspects of the accident. This was stated to be inherent not only in operations but also during design, engineering, construction, manufacture and regulation.

Views of the main causes were heavily lobbied by different groups, including the reactor's designers, power plant personnel, and the Soviet and Ukrainian governments. This was due to the uncertainty about the actual sequence of events and plant parameters. After INSAG-1 more information became available, and more powerful computing has allowed better forensic simulations.

The INSAG-7 conclusion of major factors contributory to the accident was:

INSAG-1 report (1986) 
The first official Soviet explanation of the accident was given by Soviet scientists and engineers to representatives of IAEA member states and other international organisations at the first Post-Accident Review Meeting, held at the IAEA in Vienna 25–29 August 1986. This explanation effectively placed the blame on the power plant operators. The IAEA INSAG-1 report followed shortly afterwards in September 1986, and on the whole also supported this view, based also on the information provided in discussions with the Soviet experts at the Vienna review meeting. In this view, the catastrophic accident was caused by gross violations of operating rules and regulations. For instance; "During preparation and testing of the turbine generator under run-down conditions using the auxiliary load, personnel disconnected a series of technical protection systems and breached the most important operational safety provisions for conducting a technical exercise."

It was stated that at the time of the accident the reactor was being operated with many key safety systems turned off, most notably the emergency core cooling system (ECCS), LAR (Local Automatic control system), and AZ (emergency power reduction system). Personnel had an insufficient understanding of technical procedures involved with the nuclear reactor, and knowingly ignored regulations to expedite the electrical test completion. Several procedural irregularities also helped to make the accident possible, one of which was insufficient communication between the safety officers and the operators in charge of the test.

It was held that the designers of the reactor considered this combination of events to be impossible and therefore did not allow for the creation of emergency protection systems capable of preventing the combination of events that led to the crisis, namely the intentional disabling of emergency protection equipment plus the violation of operating procedures. Thus the primary cause of the accident was the extremely improbable combination of rule infringement plus the operational routine allowed by the power station staff.

On the disconnection of safety systems, Valery Legasov said in 1987, "It was like airplane pilots experimenting with the engines in flight."
In this analysis the operators were blamed, but deficiencies in the reactor design and in the operating regulations that made the accident possible were set aside and mentioned only casually. This view was reflected in numerous publications and artistic works on the theme of the Chernobyl accident that appeared immediately after the accident, and for a long time remained dominant in the public consciousness and in popular publications.

Soviet criminal trial (1987) 

The trial took place from 7 to 30 July 1987 in a temporary courtroom set up in the House of Culture in the city of Chernobyl, Ukraine. Five plant employees (Anatoly S. Dyatlov, the former deputy chief engineer; Viktor P. Bryukhanov, the former plant director; Nikolai M. Fomin, the former chief engineer; Boris V. Rogozhin, the shift director of Reactor 4; and Aleksandr P. Kovalenko, the chief of Reactor 4); and Yuri A. Laushkin (Gosatomenergonadzor [USSR State Committee on Supervision of Safe Conduct of Work in Atomic Energy] inspector) were sentenced to ten, ten, ten, five, three, and two years respectively in labor camps. The families of Aleksandr Akimov, Leonid Toptunov and Valery Perevozchenko had received official letters, but prosecution against the employees had been terminated at their deaths.

Anatoly Dyatlov was found guilty "of criminal mismanagement of potentially explosive enterprises" and sentenced to ten years imprisonment—of which he would serve three—for the role that his oversight of the experiment played in the ensuing accident.

INSAG-7 report (1992) 

In 1991 a Commission of the USSR State Committee for the Supervision of Safety in Industry and Nuclear Power reassessed the causes and circumstances of the Chernobyl accident and came to new insights and conclusions. Based on that, INSAG published an additional report, INSAG-7, which reviewed "that part of the INSAG-1 report in which primary attention is given to the reasons for the accident," and this included the text of the 1991 USSR State Commission report translated into English by the IAEA as Annex I.

By the time of this report, the post-Soviet Ukrainian government had declassified a number of KGB documents from the period between 1971 and 1988 related to the Chernobyl plant. It mentioned, for example, previous reports of structural damage caused by negligence during construction of the plant (such as splitting of concrete layers) that were never acted upon. They documented more than 29 emergency situations in the plant during this period, eight of which were caused by negligence or poor competence on the part of personnel.

In the INSAG-7 report, most of the earlier accusations against staff for breach of regulations were acknowledged to be either erroneous, being based on incorrect information obtained in August 1986, or were judged less relevant. The INSAG-7 report also reflected the view of the 1991 USSR State Commission account which held that the operators' actions in turning off the emergency core cooling system, interfering with the settings on the protection equipment, and blocking the level and pressure in the separator drum did not contribute to the original cause of the accident and its magnitude, although they may have been a breach of regulations. In fact, turning off the emergency system designed to prevent the two turbine generators from stopping was not a violation of regulations. Soviet authorities had identified a multitude of operator actions as regulation violations in the original 1986 report while no such regulations were in fact in place.

The primary design cause of the accident, as determined by INSAG-7, was a major deficiency in safety features, in particular the "positive scram" effect due to the control rods' graphite tips that actually initially increased reactivity when control rods entered the core to reduce reactivity. There was also an overly positive void coefficient of the reactor, whereby steam-generated voids in the fuel cooling channels would increase reactivity because neutron absorption was reduced, resulting in more steam generation, and thereby more voids; a regenerative process. To avoid such conditions, it was necessary for the operators to track the value of the reactor operational reactivity margin (ORM) but this value was not readily available to the operators and they were not aware of the safety significance of ORM on void and power coefficients.
However, regulations did forbid operating the reactor with a small margin of reactivity. Yet "post-accident studies have shown that the way in which the real role of the ORM is reflected in the Operating Procedures and design documentation for the RBMK-1000 is extremely contradictory", and furthermore, "ORM was not treated as an operational safety limit, violation of which could lead to an accident".

Even in this revised analysis, the human factor remained identified as a major factor in causing the accident; particularly the operating crew's deviation from the test programme. "Most reprehensibly, unapproved changes in the test procedure were deliberately made on the spot, although the plant was known to be in a very different condition from that intended for the test." This included operating the reactor at a lower power level than the prescribed 700 MW before starting the electrical test. The 1986 assertions of Soviet experts notwithstanding, regulations did not prohibit operating the reactor at this low power level.

INSAG-7 also said, "The poor quality of operating procedures and instructions, and their conflicting character, put a heavy burden on the operating crew, including the chief engineer. The accident can be said to have flowed from a deficient safety culture, not only at the Chernobyl plant, but throughout the Soviet design, operating and regulatory organizations for nuclear power that existed at that time."

Positive void coefficient

The reactor had a dangerously large positive void coefficient of reactivity. The void coefficient is a measurement of how a reactor responds to increased steam formation in the water coolant. Most other reactor designs have a negative coefficient, i.e. the nuclear reaction rate slows when steam bubbles form in the coolant, since as the steam voids increase, fewer neutrons are slowed down. Faster neutrons are less likely to split uranium atoms, so the reactor produces less power (negative feedback effect).

Chernobyl's RBMK reactor, however, used solid graphite as a neutron moderator to slow down the neutrons, and the cooling water acted as a neutron absorber. Thus, neutrons are moderated by the graphite even if steam bubbles form in the water. Furthermore, because steam absorbs neutrons much less readily than water, increasing the voids means that more moderated neutrons are able to split uranium atoms, increasing the reactor's power output. This could create a positive feedback regenerative process (known as a positive power coefficient) which makes the RBMK design very unstable at low power levels, and prone to sudden energy surges to a dangerous level. Not only was this behaviour counter-intuitive, this property of the reactor under certain conditions was unknown to the personnel.

Control rod design

The upper half of the rod  was boron carbide, which absorbs neutrons and thereby slows the reaction. The bottom section of each control rod was a 4.5 meter graphite displacer, which prevented the channels from filling with water when rods were withdrawn. The flaw lay in the  gap between the bottom of the graphite displacer and the bottom of the reactor, meaning that the lowest portion of control rod channel was filled with water and not graphite. See page 123. Fig 11–10.  With this design, when the rods were inserted from the fully retracted position to stop the reaction on the AZ-5 signal, the graphite displaced neutron-absorbing water, causing fewer neutrons to be absorbed and increasing reactivity.  For the first 11 to 14 seconds of rod deployment until the boron was in position, reactor power across the floor of the reactor could increase, rather than decrease. This feature of control rod operation was counter-intuitive and not known to the reactor operators.

Management and operational deficiencies
Other deficiencies were noted in the RBMK-1000 reactor design, as were its non-compliance with accepted standards and with the requirements of nuclear reactor safety. While INSAG-1 and INSAG-7 reports both identified operator error as an issue of concern, the INSAG-7 identified that there were numerous other issues that were contributing factors that led to the incident. These contributing factors include:
 The plant was not designed to safety standards in effect and incorporated unsafe features
 "Inadequate safety analysis" was performed
 There was "insufficient attention to independent safety review"
 "Operating procedures not founded satisfactorily in safety analysis"
 Safety information not adequately and effectively communicated between operators, and between operators and designers
 The operators did not adequately understand safety aspects of the plant
 Operators did not sufficiently respect formal requirements of operational and test procedures
 The regulatory regime was insufficient to effectively counter pressures for production
 There was a "general lack of safety culture in nuclear matters at the national level as well as locally"

Fizzled nuclear explosion hypothesis 
The force of the second explosion and the ratio of xenon radioisotopes released after the accident led Yuri V. Dubasov in 2009 to theorise that the second explosion could have been an extremely fast nuclear power transient resulting from core material melting in the absence of its water coolant and moderator. Dubasov argued that there was no delayed supercritical increase in power but a runaway prompt criticality which would have developed much faster. He felt the physics of this would be more similar to the explosion of a fizzled nuclear weapon, and it produced the second explosion.
This meant that a nuclear event in the reactor may have ejected xenon to higher altitudes in the atmosphere than the later fire did, allowing widespread movement of xenon to remote locations. This was an alternative to the more accepted explanation of a positive-feedback power excursion where the reactor disassembled itself by steam explosion.

The more energetic second explosion, which produced the majority of the damage, was estimated by Dubasov in 2009 as equivalent to 40 billion joules of energy, the equivalent of about 10 tons of TNT. Both his 2009 and 2017 analyses argue that the nuclear fizzle event, whether producing the second or first explosion, consisted of a prompt chain reaction that was limited to a small portion of the reactor core, since self-disassembly occurs rapidly in fizzle events.

Dubasov's nuclear fizzle hypothesis was examined in 2017 by physicist Lars-Erik De Geer who put the hypothesized fizzle event as the more probable cause of the first explosion.

De Geer commented:

Release and spread of radioactive materials

Although it is difficult to compare releases between the Chernobyl accident and a deliberate air burst nuclear detonation, it has still been estimated that about four hundred times more radioactive material was released from Chernobyl than by the atomic bombing of Hiroshima and Nagasaki together. However, the Chernobyl accident only released about one hundredth to one thousandth of the total amount of radioactivity released during nuclear weapons testing at the height of the Cold War; the wide estimate being due to the different abundances of isotopes released. Lower levels of contamination were detected over all of Europe except for the Iberian Peninsula. Most of the fallout with radioactive dust particles was released during the first ten days after the accident. By around May 2, a radioactive cloud had reached the Netherlands and Belgium.

The initial evidence that a major release of radioactive material was affecting other countries came not from Soviet sources, but from Sweden.

It was Sweden's search for the source of radioactivity, after they had determined there was no leak at the Swedish plant, that at noon on 28 April, led to the first hint of a serious nuclear problem in the western Soviet Union. Hence the evacuation of Pripyat on 27 April 36 hours after the initial explosions was silently completed before the disaster became known outside the Soviet Union. The rise in radiation levels had by the subsequent days also been measured in Finland, but a civil service strike delayed the response and publication.

Contamination from the Chernobyl accident was scattered irregularly depending on weather conditions, much of it deposited on mountainous regions such as the Alps, the Welsh mountains and the Scottish Highlands, where adiabatic cooling caused radioactive rainfall. The resulting patches of contamination were often highly localized, and localised water-flows contributed to large variations in radioactivity over small areas. Sweden and Norway also received heavy fallout when the contaminated air collided with a cold front, bringing rain. There was also groundwater contamination.

Rain was deliberately seeded over  Belarus by the Soviet Air Force to remove radioactive particles from clouds heading toward highly populated areas. Heavy, black-coloured rain fell on the city of Gomel. Reports from Soviet and Western scientists indicate that the Belarusian SSR received about 60% of the contamination that fell on the former Soviet Union. However, the 2006 TORCH report stated that up to half of the volatile particles had actually landed outside the former USSR area currently making up of Ukraine, Belarus, and Russia. An unconnected large area in Russian SFSR south of Bryansk was also contaminated, as were parts of northwestern Ukrainian SSR. Studies in surrounding countries indicate that more than one million people could have been affected by radiation.

Recently published data from a long-term monitoring program (The Korma Report II) shows a decrease in internal radiation exposure of the inhabitants of a region in Belarus close to Gomel. Resettlement may even be possible in prohibited areas provided that people comply with appropriate dietary rules.

In Western Europe, precautionary measures taken in response to the radiation included banning the importation of certain foods. A 2006 study by the  found that contamination was "relatively limited, diminishing from west to east", such that a hunter consuming 40 kilograms of contaminated wild boar in 1997 would be exposed to about one millisievert.

Relative isotopic abundances 

The Chernobyl release was characterised by the physical and chemical properties of the radio-isotopes in the core. Particularly dangerous were the highly radioactive fission products, those with high nuclear decay rates that accumulate in the food chain, such as some of the isotopes of iodine, caesium and strontium. Iodine-131 was and caesium-137 remains the two most responsible for the radiation exposure received by the general population.

Detailed reports on the release of radioisotopes from the site were published in 1989 and 1995, with the latter report updated in 2002.

At different times after the accident, different isotopes were responsible for the majority of the external dose. The remaining quantity of any radioisotope, and therefore the activity of that isotope, after 7 decay half-lives have passed, is less than 1% of its initial magnitude, and it continues to reduce beyond 0.78% after 7 half-lives to 0.10% remaining after 10 half-lives have passed and so on. Some radionuclides have decay products that are likewise radioactive, which is not accounted for here. The release of radioisotopes from the nuclear fuel was largely controlled by their boiling points, and the majority of the radioactivity present in the core was retained in the reactor.
 All of the noble gases, including krypton and xenon, contained within the reactor were released immediately into the atmosphere by the first steam explosion. The atmospheric release of xenon-133, with a half-life of 5 days, is estimated at 5200 PBq.
Iodine-131 has a half-life of 8 days.
 20 to 40% of all core caesium-137 was released, 85 PBq in all. Caesium was released in aerosol form; caesium-137, along with isotopes of strontium, are the two primary elements preventing the Chernobyl exclusion zone being re-inhabited.  equals 24 kilograms of caesium-137. Cs-137 has a half-life of 30 years.
 Tellurium-132, half-life 78 hours, an estimated 1150 PBq was released.
 An early estimate for total nuclear fuel material released to the environment was %; this was later revised to %.

Two sizes of particles were released: small particles of 0.3 to 1.5 micrometres, each an individually unrecognizable small dust or smog sized particulate matter and larger settling dust sized particles that therefore were quicker to fall-out of the air, of 10 micrometres in diameter. These larger particles contained about 80% to 90% of the released high boiling point or non-volatile radioisotopes; zirconium-95, niobium-95, lanthanum-140, cerium-144 and the transuranic elements, including neptunium, plutonium and the minor actinides, embedded in a uranium oxide matrix.

The dose that was calculated is the relative external gamma dose rate for a person standing in the open. The exact dose to a person in the real world who would spend most of their time sleeping indoors in a shelter and then venturing out to consume an internal dose from the inhalation or ingestion of a radioisotope, requires a personnel specific radiation dose reconstruction analysis and whole body count exams, of which 16,000 were conducted in Ukraine by Soviet medical personnel in 1987.

Environmental impact

Water bodies 

The Chernobyl nuclear power plant is located next to the Pripyat River, which feeds into the Dnieper reservoir system, one of the largest surface water systems in Europe, which at the time supplied water to Kiev's 2.4 million residents, and was still in spring flood when the accident occurred. The radioactive contamination of aquatic systems therefore became a major problem in the immediate aftermath of the accident.

In the most affected areas of Ukraine, levels of radioactivity (particularly from radionuclides 131I, 137Cs and 90Sr) in drinking water caused concern during the weeks and months after the accident. Guidelines for levels of radioiodine in drinking water were temporarily raised to 3,700 Bq/L, allowing most water to be reported as safe. Officially it was stated that all contaminants had settled to the bottom "in an insoluble phase" and would not dissolve for 800–1000 years.
A year after the accident it was announced that even the water of the Chernobyl plant's cooling pond was within acceptable norms. Despite this, two months after the disaster the Kiev water supply was switched from the Dnieper to the Desna River.

Groundwater was not badly affected by the Chernobyl accident since radionuclides with short half-lives decayed away long before they could affect groundwater supplies, and longer-lived radionuclides such as radiocaesium and radiostrontium were adsorbed to surface soils before they could transfer to groundwater. However, significant transfers of radionuclides to groundwater have occurred from waste disposal sites in the  exclusion zone around Chernobyl. Although there is a potential for transfer of radionuclides from these disposal sites off-site (i.e. out of the  exclusion zone), the IAEA Chernobyl Report argues that this is not significant in comparison to current levels of washout of surface-deposited radioactivity.

Bio-accumulation of radioactivity in fish resulted in concentrations (both in western Europe and in the former Soviet Union) that in many cases were significantly above guideline maximum levels for consumption. Guideline maximum levels for radiocaesium in fish vary from country to country but are approximately 1000 Bq/kg in the European Union. In the Kiev Reservoir in Ukraine, concentrations in fish were in the range of 3000 Bq/kg during the first few years after the accident.

In small "closed" lakes in Belarus and the Bryansk region of Russia, concentrations in a number of fish species varied from 100 to 60,000 Bq/kg during the period 1990–92. The contamination of fish caused short-term concern in parts of the UK and Germany and in the long term (years rather than months) in the affected areas of Ukraine, Belarus, and Russia as well as in parts of Scandinavia.

Chernobyl's radiocaesium deposits were used to calibrate sedimentation samples from Lake Qattinah, Arabic: بحيرة قطينة in Syria.

Flora and fauna 
After the disaster,  of pine forest directly downwind of the reactor turned reddish-brown and died, earning the name of the "Red Forest". Some animals in the worst-hit areas also died or stopped reproducing. Most domestic animals were removed from the exclusion zone, but horses left on an island in the Pripyat River  from the power plant died when their thyroid glands were destroyed by radiation doses of 150–200 Sv. Some cattle on the same island died and those that survived were stunted because of thyroid damage. The next generation appeared to be normal. The mutation rates for plants and animals have increased by a factor of 20 because of the release of radionuclides from Chernobyl. There is evidence for elevated mortality rates and increased rates of reproductive failure in contaminated areas, consistent with the expected frequency of deaths due to mutations.

On farms in Narodychi Raion of Ukraine it is claimed that from 1986 to 1990 nearly 350 animals were born with gross deformities such as missing or extra limbs, missing eyes, heads or ribs, or deformed skulls; in comparison, only three abnormal births had been registered in the five years prior.

Subsequent research on microorganisms, while limited, suggests that in the aftermath of the disaster, bacterial and viral specimens exposed to the radiation (including Mycobacterium tuberculosis, herpesvirus, cytomegalovirus, hepatitis-causing viruses, and tobacco mosaic virus) underwent rapid changes. Activations of soil micromycetes have been reported. It is currently unclear how these changes in species with rapid reproductive turnover (which were not destroyed by the radiation but instead survived) will manifest in terms of virulence, drug resistance, immune evasion, and so on; a paper in 1998 reported the discovery of an Escherichia coli mutant that was hyper-resistant to a variety of DNA-damaging elements, including x-ray radiation, UV-C, and 4-nitroquinoline 1-oxide (4NQO). Cladosporium sphaerospermum, a species of fungus that has thrived in the Chernobyl contaminated area, has been investigated for the purpose of using the fungus' particular melanin to protect against high-radiation environments, such as space travel.

Human food chain
With radiocaesium binding less with humic acid, peaty soils than the known binding "fixation" that occurs on kaolinite rich clay soils, many marshy areas of Ukraine had the highest soil to dairy-milk transfer coefficients, of soil activity in ~ 200 kBq/m2 to dairy milk activity in Bq/L, that had ever been reported, with the transfer, from initial land activity into milk activity, ranging from 0.3−2 to 20−2 times that which was on the soil, a variance depending on the natural acidity-conditioning of the pasture.

In 1987, Soviet medical teams conducted some 16,000 whole-body count examinations on inhabitants in otherwise comparatively lightly contaminated regions with good prospects for recovery. This was to determine the effect of banning local food and using only food imports on the internal body burden of radionuclides in inhabitants. Concurrent agricultural countermeasures were used when cultivation did occur, to further reduce the soil to human transfer as much as possible. The expected highest body activity was in the first few years, where the unabated ingestion of local food, primarily milk consumption, resulted in the transfer of activity from soil to body; after the dissolution of the USSR, the now-reduced scale initiative to monitor the human body activity in these regions of Ukraine, recorded a small and gradual half-decadal-long rise, in internal committed dose, before returning to the previous trend of observing ever lower body counts each year.

This momentary rise is hypothesized to be due to the cessation of the Soviet food imports together with many villagers returning to older dairy food cultivation practices and large increases in wild berry and mushroom foraging, the latter of which have similar peaty soil to fruiting body, radiocaesium transfer coefficients.

In a 2007 paper, a robot sent into the reactor itself returned with samples of black, melanin-rich radiotrophic fungi that grow on the reactor's walls.

Of the 440,350 wild boar killed in the 2010 hunting season in Germany, approximately one thousand were contaminated with levels of radiation above the permitted limit of 600 becquerels of caesium per kilogram, of dry weight, due to residual radioactivity from Chernobyl. While all animal meat contains a natural level of potassium-40 at a similar level of activity, with both wild and farm animals in Italy containing "415 ± 56 becquerels kg−1 dw" of that naturally occurring gamma emitter.

The caesium contamination issue has historically reached some uniquely isolated and high levels approaching 20,000 Becquerels of caesium per kilogram in some specific tests; however, it has not been observed in the wild boar population of Fukushima after the 2011 accident. Evidence exists to suggest that the wild German and Ukrainian boar population are in a unique location were they have subsisted on a diet high in plant or fungi sources that biomagnifies or concentrates radiocaesium, with the most well known food source the consumption of the outer shell or wall of the "deer-truffle" elaphomyces which, along with magnifying radiocaesium, also magnifies or concentrates natural soil concentrations of arsenic.

In 2015, long-term empirical data showed no evidence of a negative influence of radiation on mammal abundance.

Precipitation on distant high ground
On high ground, such as mountain ranges, there is increased precipitation due to adiabatic cooling. This resulted in localized concentrations of contaminants on distant areas; higher in Bq/m2 values to many lowland areas much closer to the source of the plume. This effect occurred on high ground in Norway and the UK.

Norway
The Norwegian Agricultural Authority reported that in 2009 a total of 18,000 livestock in Norway required uncontaminated feed for a period before slaughter, to ensure that their meat had an activity below the government permitted value of caesium per kilogram deemed suitable for human consumption. This contamination was due to residual radioactivity from Chernobyl in the mountain plants they graze on in the wild during the summer. 1,914 sheep required uncontaminated feed for a time before slaughter during 2012, with these sheep located in only 18 of Norway's municipalities, a decrease from the 35 municipalities in 2011 and the 117 municipalities affected during 1986.
The after-effects of Chernobyl on the mountain lamb industry in Norway were expected to be seen for a further 100 years, although the severity of the effects would decline over that period. Scientists report this is due to radioactive caesium-137 isotopes being taken up by fungi such as Cortinarius caperatus which is in turn eaten by sheep while grazing.

United Kingdom
The United Kingdom restricted the movement of sheep from upland areas when radioactive caesium-137 fell across parts of Northern Ireland, Wales, Scotland, and northern England. In the immediate aftermath of the disaster in 1986, the movement of a total of 4,225,000 sheep was restricted across a total of 9,700 farms, to prevent contaminated meat entering the human food chain. The number of sheep and the number of farms affected has decreased since 1986. Northern Ireland was released from all restrictions in 2000, and by 2009, 369 farms containing around 190,000 sheep remained under the restrictions in Wales, Cumbria, and northern Scotland. The restrictions applying in Scotland were lifted in 2010, while those applying to Wales and Cumbria were lifted during 2012, meaning no farms in the UK remain restricted because of Chernobyl fallout.

The legislation used to control sheep movement and compensate farmers (farmers were latterly compensated per animal to cover additional costs in holding animals prior to radiation monitoring) was revoked during October and November 2012, by the relevant authorities in the UK. Had restrictions in the UK not occurred, a heavy consumer of lamb meat would likely have received a dose of 4.1 mSv over a lifetime.

Human impact

Acute radiation effects and immediate aftermath
The only known, causal deaths from the accident involved workers in the plant and firefighters. The reactor explosion killed two engineers and severely burned two others who were among the 237 workers hospitalized in the immediate aftermath. Of the hospitalized workers, 134 exhibited symptoms of acute radiation syndrome (including one disputed case). 28 of the hospitalized workers died within the following three months, all of whom were hospitalized for ARS and 26 were among the 56 patients hospitalized for burns. Among the fatalities in the acute phase (approximately three months), all but one patient (with grade 2 ARS) were hospitalized for grade 3 or 4 ARS. Seven out of 22 patients with grade 3 ARS survived. Only one patient out of 21 with grade 4 ARS survived.

Some sources report a total initial fatality of 31, which includes one additional death caused by coronary thrombosis attributed to stress or coincidence, but this occurred off-site.

There were a number of fishermen on the reservoir a half-kilometer from the reactor to the east. Of these, two shore fishermen, Protosov and Pustavoit, are said to have sustained doses estimated at 400 roentgens and vomited, but survived. The vast majority of Pripyat residents slept through the distant sound of the explosion, including station engineer Breus, who only became aware at 6am, the beginning of his next work shift. He would later be taken to hospital and, while there, made the acquaintance of one teen who had ventured out alone by bicycle to watch the roof fires during the night, stopping for a time and viewing the scene at the "Bridge of Death" , however contrary to this sensationalist label, the youthful night biker was treated and released from hospital, remaining in touch with Breus as of 2019.

Most serious cases of ARS were treated with the assistance of American specialist Dr. Robert Peter Gale, who documented a first of its kind treatment and supervised a number of bone marrow transplant procedures which were not successful. In 2019, Gale would write a letter to correct the popularised, though egregious, portrayal of his patients as dangerous to visitors. All those who died were station operators and firefighters, over half of which from the continued wearing of dusty soaked uniforms, causing beta burns to cover large areas of skin. In the first few minutes to days, (largely due to Np-239, a 2.4-day half-life) the beta-to-gamma energy ratio is some 30:1. Owing to the large area of burned skin and sensitivity of the GI tract, bacterial infection was and remains the overarching concern to those affected with ARS, as a leading cause of death, quarantine from the outside environment is a part of the normal treatment protocol. Many of the surviving firefighters, continue to have skin that is atrophied, spider veined with underlying fibrosis due to experiencing extensive beta burns.

Long-term impact 
In the 10 years following the accident, 14 more people who had been initially hospitalized (9 who had been hospitalized with ARS) died of various causes mostly unrelated to radiation exposure. Only two of these deaths were the result of myelodysplastic syndrome. Scientific consensus, in the form of the Chernobyl Forum, suggests that, although unexpected, there has no statistically significant increase in the incidence rate of solid cancers among rescue workers. Follow-up studies have also found this to be the case, with apparent increases in thyroid cancer simply attributed to more meticulous cancer screening for rescue workers. Childhood thyroid cancer, however, is an exception, with approximately 4000 new incidents in the general population by 2002 within contaminated regions of Belarus, Russia, and Ukraine, most of which are attributed to high environmental levels of radioactive iodine shortly after the accident. The recovery rate is ~99%, with only 15 terminal cases (9 deaths) at the time of the report. There has also been no increase in mutation rate among the children of the liquidators or general population living in the contaminated areas.

From this same report is also a commonly cited estimate for potential future cancer fatalities in the form of an increase in cancer mortality (i.e. lethality) which speculated that, at worst, ~4000 additional cancer-related fatalities were to be expected. Although it is reasonable and forward-thinking to assume that an increase in mortality has occurred among the affected population, studies have yet to confirm such an increase with meaningful statistical certainty.  

Psychosomatic illness and post-traumatic stress, resulting from widespread fear of radiological disease, is a much greater issue impacting many more people with lethal health effects, especially as it receives relatively little attention from the general public. People who believe they or others have been impacted by radiological illness, erroneous or otherwise, exhibit greater issues with feelings of no control or fatalistic/pessimistic outlooks, leading to harmful behaviors, such as a lack of initiative to treat diseases. Such fears are further strengthened by poor public understanding of the effects of radiation. Whether the area was publicly announced as a contaminated area is a better predictor of general health than the contamination itself. "Resettlement status" is an even stronger predictor: the residents of contaminated regions who were evacuated and resettled into uncontaminated regions can be compared with the residents who remained in the contaminated regions. Resettled citizens erroneously believed they had an illness related to radiation exposure more often than citizens who remained in the contaminated regions; this brings into question the effectiveness of resettlement. Such psychological distresses can also significantly increase cancer mortality rates (possibly as much as 97%, nearly double), resulting in as many as ~100,000 additional cancer mortalities among the liquidators. From this accident, the fear of radiological illness has been more of a detriment (and potentially more lethal) on the lives of affected people than the illnesses themselves and, unlike radioactive contaminants, shows no signs of diminishing in the near future.

By 2000, the number of Ukrainians claiming to be radiation 'sufferers' (poterpili) and receiving state benefits had jumped to 3.5 million, or 5% of the population. Many of these are populations resettled from contaminated zones or former or current Chernobyl plant workers. There was and remains a motivated 'push' to achieve 'sufferer' status as it gives access to state benefits and medical services that would otherwise not be made available. The apparent increases of ill health in this large group result partly from increased medical vigilance following the accident; many benign cases that would previously have gone unnoticed and untreated (especially of cancer) are now being registered.

Of all 66,000 Belarusian emergency workers, by the mid-1990s their government reported that only 150 (roughly 0.2%) died. In contrast, in the much larger work force from Ukraine, numbered in the hundreds of thousands, some 5,722 casualties from a host of non-accident causes, were reported among Ukrainian clean-up workers up to the year 1995, by the National Committee for Radiation Protection of the Ukrainian Population.

In September 1987, the I.A.E.A. held an Advisory Group Meeting at the Curie Institute in Paris on the medical handling of the skin lesions relating to the acute deaths.

Effects of main harmful radionuclides
The four most harmful radionuclides spread from Chernobyl were iodine-131, caesium-134, caesium-137 and strontium-90, with half-lives of 8.02 days, 2.07 years, 30.2 years and 28.8 years respectively. The iodine was initially viewed with less alarm than the other isotopes, because of its short half-life, but it is highly volatile and now appears to have travelled furthest and caused the most severe health problems. Strontium, on the other hand, is the least volatile of the four and is of main concern in the areas near Chernobyl itself. Iodine tends to become concentrated in thyroid and milk glands, leading, among other things, to increased incidence of thyroid cancers. The total ingested dose was largely from iodine and, unlike the other fission products, rapidly found its way from dairy farms to human ingestion. Similarly in dose reconstruction, for those evacuated at different times and from various towns, the inhalation dose was dominated by iodine (40%), along with airborne tellurium (20%) and oxides of rubidium (20%) both as equally secondary, appreciable contributors.

Long term hazards such as caesium tends to accumulate in vital organs such as the heart, while strontium accumulates in bones and may thus be a risk to bone-marrow and lymphocytes. Radiation is most damaging to cells that are actively dividing. In adult mammals cell division is slow, except in hair follicles, skin, bone marrow and the gastrointestinal tract, which is why vomiting and hair loss are common symptoms of acute radiation sickness.

Disputed investigation

The two primary individuals involved with the attempt to suggest that the mutation rate among animals was, and continues to be, higher in the Chernobyl zone, are the Anders Moller and Timothy Mousseau group. Apart from continuing to publish experimentally unrepeatable and discredited papers, Mousseau routinely gives talks at the Helen Caldicott organized symposiums for "Physicians for Social Responsibility", an anti-nuclear advocacy group devoted to bring about a "nuclear free planet". Moreover, in years past, Moller was previously caught and reprimanded for publishing papers that crossed the scientific "misconduct"/"fraud" line. The duo have more recently attempted to publish meta-analyses, in which the primary references they weigh-up, analyze and draw their conclusions from is their own prior papers along with the discredited book Chernobyl: Consequences of the Catastrophe for People and the Environment.

Withdrawn investigation
In 1996, geneticist colleagues Ronald Chesser and Robert Baker published a paper on the thriving vole population within the exclusion zone, in which the central conclusion of their work was essentially that "The mutation rate in these animals is hundreds and probably thousands of times greater than normal". This claim occurred after they had done a comparison of the mitochondrial DNA of the "Chernobyl voles" with that of a control group of voles from outside the region. The paper appeared on the front cover of the journal Nature. However, not long after publication, the authors discovered they had incorrectly classified the species of vole and therefore were genetically comparing two entirely different vole species. They issued a retraction in 1997.

Abortions 
Following the accident, journalists mistrusted many medical professionals (such as the spokesman from the UK National Radiological Protection Board), and in turn encouraged the public to mistrust them. Throughout the European continent, due to this media-driven framing of the contamination, many requests for induced abortions of otherwise normal pregnancies were obtained out of fears of radiation from Chernobyl.

Worldwide, an estimated excess of about 150,000 elective abortions may have been performed on otherwise healthy pregnancies out of fears of radiation from Chernobyl, according to Robert Baker and ultimately a 1987 article published by Linda E. Ketchum in the Journal of Nuclear Medicine which mentions but does not reference an IAEA source on the matter.

The available statistical data excludes the Soviet–Ukraine–Belarus abortion rates, as they are presently unavailable. From the available data, an increase in the number of abortions in what were healthy developing human offspring in Denmark occurred in the months following the accident, at a rate of about 400 cases. In Italy, a "slightly" above the expected number of induced abortions occurred, approximately 100.  In Greece, following the accident, many obstetricians were unable to resist requests from worried pregnant mothers over fears of radiation. Although it was determined that the effective dose to Greeks would not exceed one mSv (100 mrem), a dose much lower than that which it was determined would induce embryonic abnormalities or other non-stochastic effects, there was an observed 2,500 increase of otherwise wanted pregnancies being terminated.

No evidence of changes in the prevalence of human deformities/birth congenital anomalies that might be associated with the accident are apparent in Belarus or Ukraine, the two republics that had the highest exposure to fallout. In Sweden and in Finland where no increase in abortion rates occurred, it was likewise determined that "no association between the temporal and spatial variations in radioactivity and variable incidence of congenital malformations [was found]." A similar null increase in the abortion rate and a healthy baseline situation of no increase in birth defects was determined by assessing the Hungarian Congenital Abnormality Registry. Findings were also mirrored in Austria. Larger "mainly western European" data sets, approaching a million births in the EUROCAT database, divided into "exposed" and control groups were assessed in 1999. As no Chernobyl impacts were detected, the researchers conclude "in retrospect, the widespread fear in the population about the possible effects of exposure on the unborn fetus was not justified". Despite studies from Germany and Turkey, the only robust evidence of negative pregnancy outcomes that transpired after the accident were these elective abortion indirect effects, in Greece, Denmark, Italy etc., due to the anxieties that were created.

In very high doses, it was known at the time that radiation could cause a physiological increase in the rate of pregnancy anomalies, but unlike the dominant linear no-threshold model of radiation and cancer rate increases, it was known, by researchers familiar with both the prior human exposure data and animal testing, that the "Malformation of organs appears to be a deterministic effect with a threshold dose" below which, no rate increase is observed. This teratology (birth defects) issue was discussed by Frank Castronovo of the Harvard Medical School in 1999, publishing a detailed review of dose reconstructions and the available pregnancy data following the Chernobyl accident, inclusive of data from Kiev's two largest obstetrics hospitals. Castronovo concludes that "the lay press with newspaper reporters playing up anecdotal stories of children with birth defects" is, together with dubious studies that show selection bias, the two primary factors causing the persistent belief that Chernobyl increased the background rate of birth defects. When the vast amount of pregnancy data does not support this perception as no women took part in the most radioactive liquidator operations, no in-utero individuals would have been expected to have received a threshold dose.

Studies of low statistical significance on some of the most contaminated and proximal regions of Ukraine and Belarus, tentatively argue with some 50 children who were irradiated by the accident in utero during weeks 8 to 25 of gestation had an increased rate of intellectual disability, lower verbal IQ, and possibly other negative effects. These findings may be due to confounding factors or annual variations in random chance.

The Chernobyl liquidators, essentially an all-male civil defense emergency workforce, would go on to father normal children, without an increase in developmental anomalies or a statistically significant increase in the frequencies of germline mutations in their progeny. This normality is similarly seen in the children of the survivors of the Goiânia accident.

A 2021 study based on whole-genome sequencing of children of parents employed as liquidators indicated no trans-generational genetic effects of exposure of parents to ionizing radiation.

Cancer assessments 
A report by the International Atomic Energy Agency examines the environmental consequences of the accident. The United Nations Scientific Committee on the Effects of Atomic Radiation has estimated a global collective dose of radiation exposure from the accident "equivalent on average to 21 additional days of world exposure to natural background radiation"; individual doses were far higher than the global mean among those most exposed, including 530,000 primarily male recovery workers (the Chernobyl liquidators) who averaged an effective dose equivalent to an extra 50 years of typical natural background radiation exposure each.

Estimates of the number of deaths that will eventually result from the accident vary enormously; disparities reflect both the lack of solid scientific data and the different methodologies used to quantify mortality—whether the discussion is confined to specific geographical areas or extends worldwide, and whether the deaths are immediate, short term, or long term. In 1994, thirty-one deaths were directly attributed to the accident, all among the reactor staff and emergency workers.

The Chernobyl Forum predicts that the eventual death toll could reach 4,000 among those exposed to the highest levels of radiation (200,000 emergency workers, 116,000 evacuees and 270,000 residents of the most contaminated areas); this figure is a total causal death toll prediction, combining the deaths of approximately 50 emergency workers who died soon after the accident from acute radiation syndrome, 15 children who have died of thyroid cancer and a future predicted total of 3,935 deaths from radiation-induced cancer and leukaemia.

In a peer-reviewed paper in the International Journal of Cancer in 2006, the authors expanded the discussion on those exposed to all of Europe (but following a different conclusion methodology to the Chernobyl Forum study, which arrived at the total predicted death toll of 4,000 after cancer survival rates were factored in) they stated, without entering into a discussion on deaths, that in terms of total excess cancers attributed to the accident:

Two anti-nuclear advocacy groups have publicized non-peer-reviewed estimates that include mortality estimates for those who were exposed to even smaller amounts of radiation. The Union of Concerned Scientists (UCS) calculated that, among the hundreds of millions of people exposed worldwide, there will be an eventual 50,000 excess cancer cases, resulting in 25,000 excess cancer deaths, excluding thyroid cancer. However, these calculations are based on a simple linear no-threshold model multiplication and the misapplication of the collective dose, which the International Commission on Radiological Protection (ICRP) states "should not be done" as using the collective dose is "inappropriate to use in risk projections".

Along similar lines to the UCS approach, the 2006 TORCH report, commissioned by the European Greens political party, likewise simplistically calculates an eventual 30,000 to 60,000 excess cancer deaths in total, around the globe.

Yet the death rate from thyroid cancer has remained the same as prior to the technology. For these and other reasons, it is suggested that no reliable increase has been detected in the environs of Chernobyl, that cannot otherwise be explained as an artifact of the globally well documented Screening effect.
In 2004, the UN collaborative, Chernobyl Forum, revealed thyroid cancer among children to be one of the main health impacts from the Chernobyl accident. This is due to the ingestion of contaminated dairy products, along with the inhalation of the short-lived, highly radioactive isotope, Iodine-131. In that publication, more than 4,000 cases of childhood thyroid cancer were reported. It is important to note that there was no evidence of an increase in solid cancers or leukemia. It said that there was an increase in psychological problems among the affected population. The WHO's Radiation Program reported that the 4,000 cases of thyroid cancer resulted in nine deaths.

According to the United Nations Scientific Committee on the Effects of Atomic Radiation, up to the year 2005, an excess of more than 6,000 cases of thyroid cancer had been reported. That is, over the estimated pre-accident baseline thyroid cancer rate, more than 6,000 casual cases of thyroid cancer have been reported in children and adolescents exposed at the time of the accident, a number that is expected to increase. They concluded that there is no other evidence of major health impacts from the radiation exposure.

Well-differentiated thyroid cancers are generally treatable, and when treated the five-year survival rate of thyroid cancer is 96%, and 92% after 30 years. the United Nations Scientific Committee on the Effects of Atomic Radiation had reported 15 deaths from thyroid cancer in 2011. The International Atomic Energy Agency (IAEA) also states that there has been no increase in the rate of birth defects or abnormalities, or solid cancers—such as lung cancer—corroborating the assessments by the UN committee. UNSCEAR raised the possibility of long term genetic defects, pointing to a doubling of radiation-induced minisatellite mutations among children born in 1994. However, the risk of thyroid cancer associated with the Chernobyl accident is still high according to published studies.

The German affiliate of the anti-nuclear energy organization, the International Physicians for the Prevention of Nuclear War suggest that 10,000 people are affected by thyroid cancer as of 2006, and that 50,000 cases are expected in the future.

Other disorders 
Fred Mettler, a radiation expert at the University of New Mexico, puts the number of worldwide cancer deaths outside the highly contaminated zone at perhaps 5,000, for a total of 9,000 Chernobyl-associated fatal cancers, saying "the number is small (representing a few percent) relative to the normal spontaneous risk of cancer, but the numbers are large in absolute terms". The same report outlined studies based on data found in the Russian Registry from 1991 to 1998 that suggested that "of 61,000 Russian workers exposed to an average dose of 107 mSv about [five percent] of all fatalities that occurred may have been due to radiation exposure".

The report went into depth about the risks to mental health of exaggerated fears about the effects of radiation. According to the IAEA the "designation of the affected population as "victims" rather than "survivors" has led them to perceive themselves as helpless, weak and lacking control over their future". The IAEA says that this may have led to behaviour that has caused further health effects.

Fred Mettler commented that 20 years later: "The population remains largely unsure of what the effects of radiation actually are and retain a sense of foreboding. A number of adolescents and young adults who have been exposed to modest or small amounts of radiation feel that they are somehow fatally flawed and there is no downside to using illicit drugs or having unprotected sex. To reverse such attitudes and behaviours will likely take years, although some youth groups have begun programs that have promise." In addition, disadvantaged children around Chernobyl experience health problems that are attributable not only to the Chernobyl accident, but also to the poor state of post-Soviet health systems.

The United Nations Scientific Committee on the Effects of Atomic Radiation (UNSCEAR), part of the Chernobyl Forum, have produced their own assessments of the radiation effects. UNSCEAR was set up as a collaboration between various United Nation bodies, including the World Health Organization, after the atomic bomb attacks on Hiroshima and Nagasaki, to assess the long-term effects of radiation on human health.

Long-term radiation deaths 
The number of potential deaths arising from the Chernobyl disaster is heavily debated. The World Health Organization's prediction of 4,000 future cancer deaths in surrounding countries is based on the Linear no-threshold model (LNT), which assumes that the damage inflicted by radiation at low doses is directly proportional to the dose. Radiation epidemiologist Roy Shore contends that estimating health effects in a population from the LNT model "is not wise because of the uncertainties".

According to the Union of Concerned Scientists the number of excess cancer deaths worldwide (including all contaminated areas) is approximately 27,000 based on the same LNT.

Another study critical of the Chernobyl Forum report was commissioned by Greenpeace, which asserted that the most recently published figures indicate that in Belarus, Russia and Ukraine the accident could have resulted in 10,000–200,000 additional deaths in the period between 1990 and 2004. The Scientific Secretary of the Chernobyl Forum criticized the report's reliance on non-peer-reviewed locally produced studies. Although most of the study's sources were from peer-reviewed journals, including many Western medical journals, the higher mortality estimates were from non-peer-reviewed sources, while Gregory Härtl (spokesman for the WHO) suggested that the conclusions were motivated by ideology.

Chernobyl: Consequences of the Catastrophe for People and the Environment is a 2007 Russian publication that concludes that there were 985,000 premature deaths as a consequence of the radioactivity released. The results were criticized by M. I. Balonov from the Institute of Radiation Hygiene in St. Petersburg, who described them as biased, drawing from sources that were difficult to independently verify and lacking a proper scientific base. Balanov expressed his opinion that "the authors unfortunately did not appropriately analyze the content of the Russian-language publications, for example, to separate them into those that contain scientific evidence and those based on hasty impressions and ignorant conclusions".

According to U.S. Nuclear Regulatory Commission member and Professor of Health Physics Kenneth Mossman, the "LNT philosophy is overly conservative, and low-level radiation may be less dangerous than commonly believed." Yoshihisa Matsumoto, a radiation biologist at the Tokyo Institute of Technology, cites laboratory experiments on animals to suggest there must be a threshold dose below which DNA repair mechanisms can completely repair any radiation damage. Mossman suggests that the proponents of the current model believe that being conservative is justified due to the uncertainties surrounding low level doses and it is better to have a "prudent public health policy".

Another significant issue is establishing consistent data on which to base the analysis of the impact of the Chernobyl accident. Since 1991, large social and political changes have occurred within the affected regions and these changes have had significant impact on the administration of health care, on socio-economic stability, and the manner in which statistical data is collected. Ronald Chesser, a radiation biologist at Texas Tech University, says that "the subsequent Soviet collapse, scarce funding, imprecise dosimetry, and difficulties tracking people over the years have limited the number of studies and their reliability".

Socio-economic impact 

It is difficult to establish the total economic cost of the disaster. According to Mikhail Gorbachev, the Soviet Union spent 18 billion Rbls (the equivalent of US$2.5 billion at that time, or $ in today's dollars) on containment and decontamination, virtually bankrupting itself. In 2005, the total cost over 30 years for Belarus which includes the monthly payments to liquidators, was estimated at US$235 billion; about $ in today's dollars given inflation rates. Gorbachev in April 2006 wrote "The nuclear meltdown at Chernobyl 20 years ago this month, even more than my launch of perestroika, was perhaps the real cause of the collapse of the Soviet Union."

Ongoing costs are well known; in their 2003–2005 report, The Chernobyl Forum stated that between five and seven percent of government spending in Ukraine is still related to Chernobyl, while in Belarus more than $13 billion is thought to have been spent between 1991 and 2003, with 22% of national budget having been Chernobyl-related in 1991, falling to six percent by 2002. In 2018, Ukraine spent five to seven percent of its national budget on recovery activities related to the Chernobyl disaster. Overall economic loss is estimated at $235 billion in Belarus. Much of the current cost relates to the payment of Chernobyl-related social benefits to some seven million people across the three countries.

While much of this has been returned to use, agricultural production costs have risen due to the need for special cultivation techniques, fertilizers and additives. Politically, the accident gave great significance to the new Soviet policy of glasnost, and helped forge closer Soviet–US relations at the end of the Cold War, through bioscientific cooperation. The disaster also became a key factor in the dissolution of the Soviet Union in 1991, and a major influence in shaping the new Eastern Europe.

Both Ukraine and Belarus, in their first months of independence, lowered legal radiation thresholds from the Soviet Union's previous, elevated thresholds (from 35 rems per lifetime under the USSR to 7 rems per lifetime in Ukraine and 0.1 rems per year in Belarus).

Ukrainians viewed the Chernobyl disaster as another attempt by Russians to destroy them, comparable to the Holodomor. Meanwhile, commentators have argued that the events of the Chernobyl disaster were uniquely inclined to occur in a communist country versus a capitalist country. It has been argued that Soviet power plant administrators were not empowered to make crucial decisions when time was of the essence.

Mikhail Gorbachev, the final leader of the Soviet Union, stated in respect to the Chernobyl disaster that, "More than anything else, (Chernobyl) opened the possibility of much greater freedom of expression, to the point that the (Soviet) system as we knew it could no longer continue."

A famous Austrian Alpine farmer Sepp Holzer reported decades later that the Chernobyl disaster had ruined his business selling edible mushrooms (such as shiitake and king stropharia): "Despite the fact that our mushrooms were obviously not contaminated, overnight it became impossible to sell them."

Long term site remediation 

Following the accident, questions arose about the future of the plant and its eventual fate. All work on the unfinished reactors No. 5 and No. 6 was halted three years later. However, the trouble at the Chernobyl plant did not end with the disaster in reactor No. 4. The work was managed by Grigoriy Mihaylovich Naginskiy, the deputy chief engineer of Installation and Construction Directorate – 90. The Ukrainian government allowed the three remaining reactors to continue operating because of an energy shortage in the country.

Decommissioning of other reactors 
In October 1991, a fire broke out in the turbine building of reactor No. 2; the authorities subsequently declared the reactor damaged beyond repair, and it was taken offline. Reactor No. 1 was decommissioned in November 1996 as part of a deal between the Ukrainian government and international organizations such as the IAEA to end operations at the plant. On 15 December 2000, then-President Leonid Kuchma personally turned off reactor No. 3 in an official ceremony, shutting down the entire site.

No. 4 reactor confinement 

Soon after the accident, the reactor building was quickly encased by a mammoth concrete sarcophagus in a notable feat of construction under severe conditions. Crane operators worked blindly from inside lead-lined cabins taking instructions from distant radio observers, while gargantuan-sized pieces of concrete were moved to the site on custom-made vehicles. The purpose of the sarcophagus was to stop any further release of radioactive particles into the atmosphere, isolate the exposed core from the weather and provide safety for the continued operations of adjacent reactors one through three.

The concrete sarcophagus was never intended to last very long, with a lifespan of only 30 years. On 12 February 2013, a  section of the roof of the turbine-building collapsed, adjacent to the sarcophagus, causing a new release of radioactivity and temporary evacuation of the area. At first it was assumed that the roof collapsed because of the weight of snow, however the amount of snow was not exceptional, and the report of a Ukrainian fact-finding panel concluded that the collapse was the result of sloppy repair work and aging of the structure. Experts warned the sarcophagus itself was on the verge of collapse.

In 1997, the international Chernobyl Shelter Fund was founded to design and build a more permanent cover for the unstable and short-lived sarcophagus. It received €864 million from international donors in 2011 and was managed by the European Bank for Reconstruction and Development (EBRD). The new shelter was named the New Safe Confinement and construction began in 2010. The New Safe Confinement was completed in 2016 and slid into place over top the sarcophagus on 29 November. The huge steel arch was moved into place over several weeks. Unlike the original sarcophagus, the New Safe Confinement is designed to allow the reactor to be safely dismantled using remotely operated equipment.

Waste management 
Used fuel from units 1–3 was stored in the units' cooling ponds, and in an interim spent fuel storage facility pond, ISF-1, which now holds most of the spent fuel from units 1–3, allowing those reactors to be decommissioned under less restrictive conditions. Approximately 50 of the fuel assemblies from units 1 and 2 were damaged and required special handling. Moving fuel to ISF-1 was thus carried out in three stages: fuel from unit 3 was moved first, then all undamaged fuel from units 1 and 2, and finally the damaged fuel from units 1 and 2. Fuel transfers to ISF-1 were completed in June 2016.

A need for larger, longer-term radioactive waste management at the Chernobyl site is to be fulfilled by a new facility designated ISF-2. This facility is to serve as dry storage for used fuel assemblies from units 1–3 and other operational wastes, as well as material from decommissioning units 1–3 (which will be the first RBMK units decommissioned anywhere).

A contract was signed in 1999 with Areva NP (now Framatome) for construction of ISF-2. In 2003, after a significant part of the storage structures had been built, technical deficiencies in the design concept became apparent. In 2007, Areva withdrew and Holtec International was contracted for a new design and construction of ISF-2. The new design was approved in 2010, work started in 2011, and construction was completed in August 2017.

ISF-2 is the world's largest nuclear fuel storage facility, expected to hold more than 21,000 fuel assemblies for at least 100 years. The project includes a processing facility able to cut the RBMK fuel assemblies and to place the material in canisters, to be filled with inert gas and welded shut. The canisters are then to be transported to dry storage vaults, where the fuel containers will be enclosed for up to 100 years. Expected processing capacity is 2,500 fuel assemblies per year.

Fuel-containing materials 
According to official estimates, about 95% of the fuel in reactor No. 4 at the time of the accident (about ) remains inside the shelter, with a total radioactivity of nearly 18 million curies (670 PBq). The radioactive material consists of core fragments, dust, and lava-like "fuel containing materials" (FCM)—also called "corium"—that flowed through the wrecked reactor building before hardening into a ceramic form.

Three different lavas are present in the basement of the reactor building: black, brown, and a porous ceramic. The lava materials are silicate glasses with inclusions of other materials within them. The porous lava is brown lava that dropped into water and thus cooled rapidly. It is unclear how long the ceramic form will retard the release of radioactivity. From 1997 to 2002, a series of published papers suggested that the self-irradiation of the lava would convert all  into a submicrometre and mobile powder within a few weeks.

It has been reported that the degradation of the lava is likely to be a slow, gradual process, rather than sudden and rapid. The paper also states that when the shelter is improved, the leaching rate of the lava will decrease. As of 2021, some fuel had already degraded significantly. The famous elephant's foot, which originally was so hard that it required the use of an armor piercing AK-47 round to remove a chunk, had softened to a texture similar to sand.

Prior to the completion of the New Safe Confinement building, rainwater acted as a neutron moderator, triggering increased fission in the remaining materials, risking criticality. Gadolinium nitrate solution was used to quench neutrons to slow the fission. Even after completion of the building, fission reactions may be increasing; scientists are working to understand the cause and risks. While neutron activity has declined across most of the destroyed fuel, from 2017 until late 2020 a doubling in neutron density was recorded in the sub-reactor space, before levelling off in early 2021. This indicated increasing levels of fission as water levels dropped, the opposite of what had been expected, and atypical compared to other fuel-containing areas. The fluctuations have led to fears that a self-sustaining reaction could be created, which would likely spread more radioactive dust and debris throughout the New Safe Confinement, making future cleanup even more difficult. Potential solutions include using a robot to drill into the fuel and insert boron carbide control rods. In early 2021, a ChNPP press release stated that the observed increase in neutron densities had leveled off since the beginning of that year.

Exclusion zone 

The area has largely reverted to forest and was overrun by wildlife due to the lack of human competition for space and resources.

Some sources have estimated when the site could be considered habitable again:
 320 years or less (Ukraine state authorities, c. 2011)
 3,000 years (Christian Science Monitor, 2016)
 20,000 years or more (Chernobyl director Ihor Gramotkin, c. 2016)
 Tens of thousands of years (Greenpeace, March 2016)
In the years following the disaster, residents known as samosely illegally returned to their abandoned homes to regain their lives. Most people are retired and survive mainly from farming and packages delivered by visitors. , 187 locals had returned to the zone and were living permanently there.

In 2011, Ukraine opened up the sealed zone around the Chernobyl reactor to tourists wishing to learn more about the 1986 tragedy. Sergii Mirnyi, a radiation reconnaissance officer at the time of the accident, and now an academic at National University of Kyiv-Mohyla Academy, has written about the psychological and physical effects on survivors and visitors, and worked as an advisor to Chernobyl tourism groups.

Forest fire concerns 

During the dry season, forest fires are a perennial concern in areas contaminated by radioactive material. Dry conditions and build-up of debris make the forests a ripe breeding ground for wildfires. Depending on prevailing atmospheric conditions, smoke from wildfires could potentially spread more radioactive material outside the exclusion zone. In Belarus, the Bellesrad organization is tasked with overseeing food cultivation and forestry management in the area.

In April 2020, forest fires spread through  of the exclusion zone, causing increased radiation from the release of caesium-137 and strontium-90 from the ground and biomass. The increase in radioactivity was detectable by the monitoring network but did not pose a threat to human health. The average radiation dose that Kyiv residents received as a result of the fires was estimated to be 1 nSv.

Recovery projects 
The Chernobyl Trust Fund was created in 1991 by the United Nations to help victims of the Chernobyl accident. It is administered by the United Nations Office for the Coordination of Humanitarian Affairs, which also manages strategy formulation, resource mobilization, and advocacy efforts. Beginning in 2002, under the United Nations Development Programme, the fund shifted its focus from emergency assistance to long-term development.

The Chernobyl Shelter Fund was established in 1997 at the G8 summit in Denver to finance the Shelter Implementation Plan (SIP). The plan called for transforming the site into an ecologically safe condition through stabilization of the sarcophagus and construction of a New Safe Confinement (NSC) structure. While the original cost estimate for the SIP was US$768 million, the 2006 estimate was $1.2 billion. The NSC was moved into position in November 2016 and was expected to be completed by late 2017.

In 2003, the United Nations Development Programme launched the Chernobyl Recovery and Development Programme (CRDP) for the recovery of affected areas. The programme was initiated in February 2002 based on the recommendations in the report on Human Consequences of the Chernobyl Nuclear Accident. The main goal of the CRDP was supporting the Government of Ukraine in mitigating long-term social, economic, and ecological consequences of the Chernobyl catastrophe. CRDP works in the four most affected Ukrainian areas: Kyivska, Zhytomyrska, Chernihivska and Rivnenska.

More than 18,000 Ukrainian children affected by the disaster have been treated in the resort town of Tarará, Cuba since 1990.

The International Project on the Health Effects of the Chernobyl Accident was created and received US$20 million, mainly from Japan, in hopes of discovering the main cause of health problems due to iodine-131 radiation. These funds were divided among Ukraine, Belarus, and Russia, the three main affected countries, for further investigation of health effects. As there was significant corruption in former Soviet countries, most of the foreign aid was given to Russia, and no results from the funding were demonstrated.

In 2019, it became known that the Ukrainian government in power at the time aimed to make Chernobyl a tourist attraction.

Nuclear debate 

The Chernobyl accident attracted a great deal of interest. Because of the distrust that many people had in the Soviet authorities, which engaged in a major cover-up of the disaster, a great deal of debate about the situation at the site occurred in the First World during the early days of the event. Because of defective intelligence based on satellite imagery, it was thought that unit number three had also had a dire accident. Journalists mistrusted many professionals, and they in turn encouraged the public to mistrust them.
The accident raised already heightened concerns about fission reactors worldwide, and while most concern was focused on those of the same unusual design, hundreds of disparate nuclear reactor proposals, including those under construction at Chernobyl, reactors numbers 5 and 6, were eventually cancelled. With ballooning costs as a result of new nuclear reactor safety system standards and the legal and political costs in dealing with the increasingly hostile/anxious public opinion, there was a precipitous drop in the rate of new reactor construction after 1986.

The accident also raised concerns about the cavalier safety culture in the Soviet nuclear power industry, slowing industry growth and forcing the Soviet government to become less secretive about its operating procedures. The government coverup of the Chernobyl disaster was a catalyst for glasnost, which "paved the way for reforms leading to the Soviet collapse." Numerous structural and construction quality issues, as well as deviations from the original plant design, had been known to KGB since at least 1973 and passed on to the Central Committee, which took no action and classified the information.

In Italy, the Chernobyl accident was reflected in the outcome of the 1987 referendum. As a result of that referendum, Italy began phasing out its nuclear power plants in 1988, a decision that was effectively reversed in 2008. A 2011 referendum reiterated Italians' strong objections to nuclear power, thus abrogating the government's 2008 decision.

In Germany, the Chernobyl accident led to the creation of a federal environment ministry, after several states had already created such a post. The post has been held, among others, by Angela Merkel who would later become leader of the opposition and then chancellor. The German environmental minister was given the authority over reactor safety as well, a responsibility the current minister still holds today. The Chernobyl disaster is also credited with strengthening the anti-nuclear movement in Germany, which culminated in the decision to end the use of nuclear power made by the 1998–2005 Schröder government. A temporary reversal of this policy was in turn reverted after the Fukushima nuclear disaster.

In direct response to the Chernobyl disaster, a conference to create a Convention on Early Notification of a Nuclear Accident was called in 1986 by the International Atomic Energy Agency. The resulting treaty has bound signatory member states to provide notification of any nuclear and radiation accidents that occur within its jurisdiction that could affect other states, along with the Convention on Assistance in the Case of a Nuclear Accident or Radiological Emergency.

The Chernobyl disaster, along with the space shuttle Challenger disaster, the Three Mile Island accident, and the Bhopal disaster have been used together as case studies, both by the US government and by third parties, in research concerning the root causes of such disasters, such as sleep deprivation and mismanagement.

Cultural impact 

The Chernobyl tragedy has inspired many artists across the world to create works of art, animation, video games, theatre and cinema about the disaster. The HBO series Chernobyl and the book by the Ukrainian writer Svetlana Alexievich Voices from Chernobyl, are two well-known works that talk about the catastrophe that destroyed millions of lives. The Ukrainian artist Roman Gumanyuk created a series of artworks called "Pripyat Lights, or Chernobyl shadows" that includes 30 oil paintings about the Chernobyl accident. The series of artwork was exhibited at the National Fine Art Museum of Kyrgyzstan in Bishkek, the Kasteev State Museum of Arts of Kazakhstan in Almaty, the Vashchenko Art Gallery of Gomel in Belarus, and at the Museum of Chernobyl in Kharkiv in Ukraine in the years 2012–2013. The video game S.T.A.L.K.E.R.: Shadows of Chernobyl released by THQ in 2007, is a first-person shooter set in the Exclusion Zone. A prequel called S.T.A.L.K.E.R.: Clear Sky was released in 2008 following with a sequel S.T.A.L.K.E.R.: Call of Pripyat released in 2010. Finally, the horror film Chernobyl Diaries released in 2012 is about six tourists that hire a tour guide to take them to the abandoned city of Pripyat where they discover they are not alone.

Filmmakers have created documentaries that examine the aftermath of the disaster over the years. Documentaries like the Oscar-winning Chernobyl Heart released in 2003, explore how radiation affected people living in the area and information about the long-term side effects of radiation exposure over the years that include mental disabilities, physical disabilities, and genetic mutations after the disaster.The Babushkas of Chernobyl released in 2015, is a documentary that explores the story of the three women who decided to return to the exclusion zone after the disaster. In the documentary, the Babushkas show the polluted water, their food from radioactive gardens, and explain how they manage to survive in this exclusion zone despite the radioactive levels of it. Lastly, the documentary The Battle of Chernobyl, released in 2006, shows a rare original footage a day before the disaster in the city of Pripyat, then through different methods the documentary goes in depth on the chronological events that led to the explosion of the reactor No. 4 and the disaster response in which 50,000 men from Soviet Union engaged to liquidate the radioactivity of the damaged reactor.

Tourism 
In July 2019, Ukrainian president Volodymyr Zelenskyy announced that the Chernobyl site would become an official tourist attraction. Zelenskyy said, "We must give this territory of Ukraine a new life," after Chernobyl saw an increase in visitors since the HBO mini-series. Dr. T. Steen, a microbiology and immunology teacher at Georgetown's School of Medicine, recommends tourists to wear clothes and shoes they are comfortable with throwing away. Most importantly, Steen suggests to avoid plant life, especially the depths of the forest due to the high levels of radiation. Because the areas were not cleaned in the aftermath of the disaster, they remain highly contaminated. Research showed that fungus, moss, and mushrooms are radioactive. Drinking or eating from there could be dangerous. Generally speaking, Chernobyl can be a safe place, Dr. Steen said "but it depends on how people behave."

See also 
 
 
 
 
 
 
 
 
 
 Capture of Chernobyl — part of the 2022 Russian invasion of Ukraine

References

Notes

Footnotes

Further reading 

 
 
 
 
 
 
 
 
 Plokhy, Serhii. Chernobyl: History of a Tragedy (London: Allen Lane, 2018).

External links 

 Official UN Chernobyl site
 International Chernobyl Portal chernobyl.info, UN Inter-Agency Project ICRIN
 Frequently Asked Chernobyl Questions, by the IAEA
 Chernobyl disaster facts and information, by National Geographic
 Chernobyl Recovery and Development Programme (United Nations Development Programme)
 Footage and documentary films about Chernobyl disaster on Net-Film Newsreels and Documentary Films Archive
 Photographs from inside the zone of alienation and City of Prypyat (2010)
 Photographs from the City of Pripyat, and of those affected by the disaster
 English Russia Photos of a RBMK-based power plant, showing details of the reactor hall, pumps, and the control room
 Post-Soviet Pollution: Effects of Chernobyl from theDean Peter Krogh Foreign Affairs Digital Archives
 Map of residual radioactivity around Chernobyl

 
1986 health disasters
1986 in Belarus
1986 in the Soviet Union
1986 in Ukraine
1986 industrial disasters
April 1986 events in Europe
Chernobyl, Ukraine
Civilian nuclear power accidents
Disasters in the Soviet Union
Environment of the Soviet Union
Environmental disasters in Europe
Environmental disasters in Ukraine
Explosions in 1986
Fires in Ukraine
Health in Ukraine
Industrial fires and explosions
Man-made disasters in Belarus
Pripyat
Radiation accidents and incidents
INES Level 7 accidents
1986 disasters in Ukraine